Cape Brewster (meaning 'the bad cape') is a headland in the Greenland Sea, east Greenland, Sermersooq municipality.

History
This headland was named Cape Brewster by William Scoresby (1789 – 1857) in 1822 to honour his friend, inventor David Brewster (1781–1868).

Geography
Cape Brewster is the easternmost point of the jagged and mountainous Savoia Peninsula and the northernmost point of the Blosseville Coast. 

It is located at the end of the southern side of the mouth of the Scoresby Sound, opposite Cape Tobin (Uunarteq). 
The cape lies in the desolate and impressive area of the southern shore of the sound with steep dark basalt walls rising between 1,000 and 2,000 m (3,280-6,560 ft).

See also
Geography of Greenland
Steward Island

References

External links
 Cape Brewster, Greenland

Headlands of Greenland